Redding may refer to:

People
See: Redding (surname)

Places in the United Kingdom
Redding, Falkirk, a village in the Falkirk council area
Reddingmuirhead, a village in Falkirk uphill from Redding
 Reading, Berkshire, pronounced like Redding, an historic market town

Places in the United States
Redding, California
Redding, Indiana
Redding, Iowa
Redding Township, Jackson County, Indiana
Reddington, Indiana, an unincorporated town in Redding Township
Redding Township, Michigan
Redding, Connecticut

Entertainment
Redding (band), American indie rock band from St. Louis, Missouri
Noel Redding, English musician and bassist for the Jimi Hendrix Experience
Otis Redding, American soul singer
The Reddings, American band formed by Otis Redding's two sons
The Redding Brothers, American rock and roll band from Nashville, Tennessee
Redding (artist), American hip-hop artist

Other
Redding Record Searchlight, newspaper serving Redding, California
Redding Municipal Airport, city-owned public-use airport in Redding, California
Redding School District, one of many school districts in Redding, California
Redding Rage, professional women's football team based out of Redding, California
Redding Rancheria, American Indian reservation in Shasta County, California
Safford Unified School District v. Redding, a United States Supreme Court case concerning a strip search conducted by public school officials

See also
Redding station (disambiguation), stations of the name
Redding Township (disambiguation)
Reding (disambiguation)
Reddington (disambiguation)
Redington (disambiguation)
Reddin
Redden (disambiguation)
Reading (disambiguation)